Abdul Carrupt (born 28 December 1985) is a professional footballer who currently plays for Swiss club Étoile Carouge. He also holds Swiss citizenship. Born in Switzerland, he represented Guinea-Bissau at international level.

External links

 Career history at ASF
 

1985 births
Living people
Citizens of Guinea-Bissau through descent
Bissau-Guinean footballers
Association football midfielders
Guinea-Bissau international footballers
Footballers from Geneva
Swiss men's footballers
FC Sion players
Yverdon-Sport FC players
FC Chiasso players
FC Lausanne-Sport players
Swiss people of Bissau-Guinean descent
Swiss sportspeople of African descent